"Infinity" is a song by American singer-songwriter and record producer Mariah Carey from her sixth compilation album, #1 to Infinity (2015). It was released by Epic Records on April 27, 2015, as the only single from the album. Carey wrote the song in collaboration with Eric Hudson, Priscilla Renea, Taylor Parks and Ilsey Juber. Carey and Hudson also produced the track. It is an R&B song; the lyrics are about Carey putting herself first and emancipation. However, many critics likened the content to the singer's separation from her then-husband, entertainer Nick Cannon.

Critical response to "Infinity" was positive, with Carey's vocals and humorous songwriting praised. Particular emphasis was placed on the reference to Fritos. In the United States, the song reached number eighty-two on the Billboard Hot 100, and charted on several R&B component charts. In Europe, it peaked at number twenty-seven on the UK R&B Chart, and made the top twenty in Spain and top thirty in Hungary. Carey performed a medley of her 1990 debut single "Vision of Love" with "Infinity" at the 2015 Billboard Music Awards, Live! with Kelly and Michael and Jimmy Kimmel Live!.

Background
"Infinity" is the only new recording to be included on Carey's third greatest hits album, #1 to Infinity (2015). It was written and produced by Carey and Eric Hudson, with additional songwriting from Priscilla Renea, Taylor Parks and Ilsey Juber. Carey unveiled the single's artwork on April 24, 2015, via music identification service Shazam. Mike Wass for Idolator wrote that Carey exudes "overpowering glamor" and "looks typically ravishing in a cleavage-exposing, black ensemble, which she accentuates with huge diamond earrings and fabulous windswept hair."

Composition and lyrical interpretation

"Infinity" is a mid-tempo R&B ballad that lasts for a duration of four minutes. Carey belts the lines, "Close the door, lose the key, leave my heart on the mat for me. I was yours eternally, there's an end to infinity", while the songs hook consists of the singer "breathily cooing" the title repeatedly in a descending vocal run. Accompanied by an orchestral synth, string and brass instrumental, Alex Camp of Slant Magazine described "Infinity" as a "welcome throwback to Mariah's early ballads". Andrew Unterberger of Spin likened the intro to the work of Just Blaze, and noted that she finishes the song with a whistle note. According to its lyrics, Carey is putting herself first in order to emancipate herself. As described by Wass, "Infinity" is "distinctly unromantic" and "a kiss-off anthem", writing that it sits somewhere in between two of Carey's previous singles, "Obsessed" (2009) and "You're Mine (Eternal)" (2014).

According to the sheet music published at Musicnotes.com by Universal Music Publishing Group, the song is written in the key of D major with a tempo of 67 beats per minute.  The song is written in cut time and follows a chord progression of Gmaj7 – D/F – Em7, with Carey's vocals spanning three octaves, from D3 to D6.

The lyric "Boy, you actin’ so corny like Fritos" generated a positive response from both critics and fans alike, with MTV News reporting that fans were "freaking" over it. Wass described the inclusion of Fritos as "hilarious", while Camp likened it to a form of product placement. Billboard highlighted the juxtaposition between the chorus, "Close the door/Lose the key/Leave my heart on the mat for me/I was yours eternally/There's an end to infinity" and one of the verses, "Name hold weight like kilos/Boy you actin' so corny like Fritos/Wouldn't have none of that without me, though/Ain't none of my business, it's tea though/Outta ammo, gotta reload/If life was a game you're a free throw/It's nothing that you don't already know," noting that the former is "almost sweet" compared to the latter.

The lyrics aroused suspicion amongst critics that it was referring to Carey's separation from her second husband, Nick Cannon. Daniel D’Addario of Time called "Infinity" a "kiss-off track" directed at Cannon, while Camp wrote that the song will be "better remembered" for its lyrical content aimed at Cannon. A reviewer for Billboard wrote that Carey was possibly "returning to form as the queen of post-heartbreak empowerment", but speculated that the lyrics were most likely about Cannon. Brian Mansfield of USA Today felt that "Infinity" is more of a "kiss-off" than "come-on" track. Unterberger documented that fans would "prognosticate" over whether or not the lyrics pertained to her marriage to Cannon. Emilee Linder for MTV News noticed that Carey appeared to refer to their separation and ongoing co-parenting of their twins, Moroccan and Monroe, in the line "Ain't no being friends/ Ain’t no false pretense/ Ain’t no make amends/ Ain’t no come agains/ That’s the story, ain’t no happy ends." However, Carey has denied that the lyrics are in any way related to her personal life.  When Liz Hernandez of Access Hollywood asked if the lyrics were about her relationship with Cannon, Carey responded by saying that it is about putting herself first, and that even if the lyrics were directed at Cannon, she would not publicly confirm it:

Music video
The song's accompanying music video was directed by Brett Ratner, a longtime friend of Carey's, and premiered on June 2, 2015. Clips of Carey performing "Infinity" at her Las Vegas residency are intercut with cameos by Tyson Beckford and Jussie Smollett.

Remix
On July 30, 2015, Carey posted a photo on her Instagram account accompanied by Hudson, French Montana and Justin Bieber at recording studio Record Plant in Hollywood. It was reported by TMZ that Carey, Hudson and Montana were working on a remix to "Infinity", and that Bieber "decided to pop in". They played the remix to Bieber, who after expressing his admiration for Carey and the song, decided to contribute some vocals to it. With Carey only performing the hook to the original version of "Infinity", the theme of the remix is that she rejects each of the three featured artists proposals. The song begins with a "laconic rap" by Montana, followed by Carey singing the hook over a "synth-laden chorus", which has a heavier instrumental and bass compared to the original version.

Bieber begins his verse approximately one minute and forty-five seconds in, singing the new lyrics. A reviewer for the Inquisitor praised the collaboration, however Idolator's Christina Lee was critical of the remix, writing "Two of them don’t sound like grown men — and they get the longer verses. French’s loopy rapping and off-key warbling is incoherent. Justin’s attempts to sound pained just sounds whiny." It is the second time that Carey and Bieber have collaborated, the first being when the two re-recorded Carey's 1994 song "All I Want for Christmas Is You" for Bieber's 2011 Christmas album Under the Mistletoe.

Critical reception
"Infinity" garnered a positive response from critics, many of whom complimented its throwback feel, as well as Carey's vocals and songwriting. Billboard was complimentary of the song, writing "The throwback-flavored track is a soaring break-up track, complete with sassy lines that shut down the guy she's singing about." Mansfield and Wass both complimented the non sequitur lyrical couplet of "Boy you so corny like Fritos" and "If life was a game you’re a free throw". Mansfield further noted that although "Infinity" does not "recapture the glory" of past singles "Dreamlover" (1993) and "Always Be My Baby" (1995), "it sure gets the sound right," while Wass wrote that "Infinity" showcases Carey's vocal range and "knack for writing hilarious one-liners." D’Addario echoed Wass's sentiment regarding the couplet, writing that the song is "full of Carey’s trademark askew wit". Unterberger concluded his review by writing that no other singer could perform "Infinity" as well as Carey. Although Camp wrote that "Infinity" delivers everything listeners have come to grow accustomed to hearing from Carey, such as whistle notes and "sudden shifts from chest to head voice", she disapproved of the drawn out "non-hook". She further criticised the song's melodic structure, writing that it appeared to cover up Carey's "ailing voice". Despite praising the song, several critics wrote that "Infinity" was unlikely to become her nineteenth number-one on the Billboard Hot 100. In 2020, Billboard ranked it as the 94th greatest song of Carey's career.

Chart performance
In the United States, "Infinity" peaked at number eighty-two on the Billboard Hot 100, with first week sales figures of 26,000 downloads and 1.8 million streams. Her forty-seventh entry on the Hot 100 in twenty-five years following her debut in 1990, it places her ninth amongst artists with the most entries. It further peaked at number forty-five on the Digital Songs chart, number twenty-two on the Adult R&B songs chart, number eleven on both the R&B Songs and the R&B/Hip-Hop Digital Songs charts, and number twenty-eight on the Hot R&B/Hip-Hop Songs chart. In the United Kingdom, the song reached number twenty-seven on the UK R&B Chart, but missed the top one-hundred on the UK Singles Chart, peaking at one-hundred and fifty-four for only one week. In Europe, "Infinity" made the top twenty in Spain and the top thirty in Hungary. Elsewhere, the song peaked at number fifty-two in Sweden and eighty-five in France. The song originally peaked at number sixty-four, and later at forty-three, in Japan.

Promotion
Carey performed a medley of her 1990 debut single "Vision of Love" with "Infinity" as part of its promotion, the first time being at the 2015 Billboard Music Awards on May 17, 2015, her first appearance at the awards show in seventeen years. A video tribute to the singer was shown prior to the singer entering the stage, who was wearing a "sheer and glittery" dress. Andrew Hampp for Billboard noted that it was an "Octave-leaping" performance and one of the most memorable of the night. However Carey's vocals, despite confirming that she had been suffering from bronchitis prior to the performance, garnered a mixed reaction from users on Twitter. D’Addario  wrote that she sang "Vision of Love" with "evident confidence", but noted that the key had been lowered. The next day, Carey repeated the medley on Jimmy Kimmel Live!.

The singer performed the medley on Live! with Kelly and Michael on May 22, 2015, during their week-long Disney World take-over. On a platform above the road on Main Street, U.S.A., Carey wore a magenta dress inspired by the one which Disney character Aurora wears in Sleeping Beauty (1959). "Infinity" is included as the closing song on the set-list of her third headlining residency Mariah Carey Number 1's at The Colosseum at the Caesars Palace hotel in Las Vegas.

Credits and personnel
The following credits were adapted from the liner notes of #1 to Infinity, Epic Records.

Recording locations
 Recording –Windmark Recording Studios, Santa Monica, CA.
 Mixing – Ninja Beat Club, Atlanta, GA.
 Mastering – Powers Mastering, Florida

Personnel

 Songwriting – Mariah Carey, Priscilla Renea, Taylor Parks, Ilsey Juber, Eric Hudson
 Production – Mariah Carey, Eric Hudson
 Recording – Brian Garten, Julian Prindle, Jordan Stilwell and Tito JustMusic
 Assistant recording – Tristan Bott, Brandon Wood, Matts E. Larson
 Mixing – Phil Tan
 Additional/assistant engineering – Daniela Rivera
 Mastering – Herb Powers

 Programming – Eric Hudson
 Drums – Lawrence Qualls
 Additional drum production – Andrew Clifton
 Live strings/violin – Peter Lee Johnson
 Guitar/Bass Guitar/Piano/Fender Rhodes – Eric Hudson
 Background vocals – Mariah Carey

Charts

References

External links
 

2010s ballads
2015 singles
Mariah Carey songs
Music videos directed by Brett Ratner
Contemporary R&B ballads
Songs written by Mariah Carey
2015 songs
Epic Records singles
Songs written by Eric Hudson
Songs written by Muni Long
Songs written by Ilsey Juber
Songs written by Tayla Parx